Rolando Alvaro "Rolo" Silva Iglecia (February 19, 1945 - June 7, 2022), was a Puerto Rican politician from the New Progressive Party (PNP). He served as member of the Senate of Puerto Rico from 1981 to 1997.

Silva served in the United States Army as a captain during the Vietnam War. He was elected to the Senate of Puerto Rico in the 1980 general election. He represented the District of San Juan. Silva was reelected three more times (1984, 1988, and 1992).

After that, Silva has worked as a Legislative Advisor for the President of the Senate Thomas Rivera Schatz.

Rolando Silva died on a Tuesday June 7, 2022. He was suffering from Alzheimer's disease at an assisted living home at age 77. He was buried at the Puerto Rico National Cemetery in Bayamón, Puerto Rico.

See also
21st Senate of Puerto Rico

References

1945 births
2022 deaths
Deaths from Alzheimer's disease
Members of the Senate of Puerto Rico
Neurological disease deaths in Puerto Rico